Andrea Burke, née Henkel (born 10 December 1977) is a retired German professional biathlete and the younger sister of Manuela Henkel, a successful cross-country skier. She trained at SV Großbreitenbach. Andrea Henkel started out as a cross-country skier but later specialised in biathlon when women's biathlon became an Olympic sport.

Since the 1998/99 season, she was a regular member of the German team in the Biathlon World Cup. After several top-ten results, she could win her first World Cup event in 1999, her second year. She was most successful in the 2006/07 season, which she finished first in the overall standings.

Henkel has won four Olympic medals: one gold medal at the 2002 Winter Olympics in the 15 km individual, and a gold (2002),  silver (2006) and bronze (2010) medal in relay competitions. She is also the first biathlete to become world champion in each individual event: 2005 in the 15 km individual, 2007 in the 12.5 km mass start, and 2008 in the 7.5 km sprint and subsequent 10 km pursuit. She has won a total of eight gold, six silver and two bronze medals at world championships. She retired from the sport at the end of the 2013/14 season.

Other Achievements

 Biathlon Overall World Cup
 1 × overall winner (2006–07)
 5 × best German athlete in the Overall World Cup (5th in 1999-2000 and 2000–01; 1st in 2006–07; 2nd in 2010–11, 3rd in 2012–13)
 Biathlon discipline World Cup
 1 × Individual discipline World Cup winner (2006–07)
 race victories in Biathlon World Cup¹
 4 × Individual victories
 5 × Sprint victories
 8 × Pursuit victories
 5 × Mass Start victories
 14 × Relay victories

(¹ race victories in Olympic Games and World Championships are included)

Olympic Games

World Championships

Individual victories
22 victories (5 Sp, 8 Pu, 4 In, 5 MS) 

*Results are from IBU races which include the Biathlon World Cup, Biathlon World Championships and the Winter Olympic Games.

Personal life
On 25 October 2014 Henkel married the American biathlete Tim Burke.

References

External links

 Official website of Andrea Henkel
 

1977 births
Living people
People from Ilmenau
People from Bezirk Suhl
German female biathletes
Sportspeople from Thuringia
Olympic biathletes of Germany
Biathletes at the 2002 Winter Olympics
Biathletes at the 2006 Winter Olympics
Biathletes at the 2010 Winter Olympics
Biathletes at the 2014 Winter Olympics
Medalists at the 2002 Winter Olympics
Medalists at the 2006 Winter Olympics
Medalists at the 2010 Winter Olympics
Olympic medalists in biathlon
Olympic bronze medalists for Germany
Olympic silver medalists for Germany
Olympic gold medalists for Germany
Biathlon World Championships medalists
Holmenkollen Ski Festival winners
Holmenkollen medalists
20th-century German women